Ricardo Kierkegaard (born 10 December 1952) is an Argentine equestrian. He competed in two events at the 1996 Summer Olympics.

References

1952 births
Living people
Argentine male equestrians
Olympic equestrians of Argentina
Equestrians at the 1996 Summer Olympics
Equestrians at the 2007 Pan American Games
Sportspeople from Buenos Aires
Pan American Games competitors for Argentina